Brydon Baker (1898–1973) was an American cinematographer. During the 1930s he worked on Poverty Row, generally on westerns.

Selected filmography

 Sagebrush Politics (1929)
 Lightning Range (1933)
 The Fighting Cowboy (1933)
 The Way of the West (1934)
 Frontier Days (1934)
 Boss Cowboy (1934)
 The Pecos Dandy (1934)
 Western Racketeers (1934)
 Paradise Valley (1934)
 Timber Terrors (1935)
 Courage of the North (1935)
 The Phantom from 10,000 Leagues (1955)
 Walk the Dark Street (1956)
 Scandal Incorporated (1956)
 Wetbacks (1956)
 The Storm Rider (1957)
 Ride a Violent Mile (1957)
 Copper Sky (1957)
 Outlaw Queen (1957)
 From Hell It Came (1957)
 Escape from Red Rock (1957)
 Cattle Empire (1958)
 Space Master X-7 (1958)
 Return of the Fly (1959)
 20,000 Eyes (1961)
 Valley of the Dragons (1961)
 Ring of Terror (1962)
 Taffy and the Jungle Hunter (1965)

References

Bibliography
 Pitts, Michael R. Poverty Row Studios, 1929–1940: An Illustrated History of 55 Independent Film Companies, with a Filmography for Each. McFarland & Company, 2005.

External links

1898 births
1973 deaths
American cinematographers
People from Peoria, Illinois